Branko Marušič (born 1938) is a Slovenian historian.

Born to an upper middle class Slovene family in Gorizia, Italy, he moved with the family to the Yugoslav side of the Yugoslav–Italian border in 1947, and has been living in Solkan since. After finishing the Nova Gorica Grammar School, he studied history at the University of Ljubljana. 

A specialist on political history of the 19th century, he has written many volumes on a variety of topics, focusing on the history of Slovene–Italian border regions of Goriška and Venezia Giulia. He writes both in Slovene and Italian. He is for his studies of Slovene–Italian relations in the 19th and 20th century, and has been praised for his contributions in the cultivation of Slovene–Italian cultural and historical dialogue. He was member of the Slovenian-Italian Cultural-Historical Commission, established by the governments of the two countries to shed light on the historical relationship between the two peoples from 1880 to 1954.

He is currently a senior researcher at the Research Centre of the Slovenian Academy of Sciences and Arts.

He is the brother of the politician Tomaž Marušič and of the landscape architect Ivan Janez Marušič.

References

20th-century Slovenian historians
University of Ljubljana alumni
People from Gorizia
People from the City Municipality of Nova Gorica
Living people
1938 births
21st-century Slovenian historians